Nowickea is a genus of flowering plants belonging to the family Phytolaccaceae.

It is native to Mexico.

The genus name of Nowickea is in honour of Joan W. Nowicke (b. 1938), an American botanist who worked for the Smithsonian Institution, between 1972 and 1999, in the Department of Botany, from the National Museum of Natural History. 
It was first described and published in Brittonia Vol.41 on page 399 in 1989.

Known species
According to Kew:
Nowickea glabra 
Nowickea xolocotzii

References

Phytolaccaceae
Caryophyllales genera
Plants described in 1989
Flora of Mexico